The University of Port-au-Prince (UP) is a for-profit private higher education institution located in Port-au-Prince, Haiti founded on 3 November 1983.

Its enrollment is ranged from 1,000 to 1,999 students. UP offers courses and programs leading to officially recognized higher education degrees in several areas of study.

Athletics
UP won the 2008–09 University Basketball Championship of Haiti.

References

External links
Université de Port-au-Prince (official site)

Universities in Haiti
Buildings and structures in Port-au-Prince
1983 establishments in Haiti
Educational institutions established in 1983